James Stewart Tolkan (born June 20, 1931) is an American actor. He is best known for his roles as Mr. Strickland in Back to the Future (1985) and Back to the Future Part II (1989), and as Marshall Strickland in Back to the Future Part III (1990). Other memorable film roles include Love and Death (1975), Top Gun (1986), Masters of the Universe (1987) and Dick Tracy (1990).

Early life
Tolkan was born in Calumet, Michigan, the son of Dale Nichols and Ralph M. Tolkan, a cattle dealer.

He attended the University of Iowa, Coe College, the Actors Studio and Eastern Arizona College. Tolkan served in the U.S. Navy onboard the USS Sandoval, but he had an issue with his heart; within a year, he was discharged for medical reasons.

Career
Tolkan is known for his role in the 1985 film Back to the Future as the strict Hill Valley High School principal, Gerald Strickland; the character refers to Marty McFly, his father, and Biff Tannen derisively as "slackers". He reprised the role in the 1989 sequel Back to the Future Part II, in which unnamed gang members make a drive-by assault on him in a dystopian 1985; he also refers to these criminals as "slackers" as he shoots back. In 1990, he played the part of Mr. Strickland's grandfather Chief Marshal James Strickland in Back to the Future Part III. Tolkan would again reprise his role as Strickland, and the character's ancestors and descendants, in the 1991 animated series spin-off.

Other well-known roles include an FBI agent in WarGames and Stinger, the no-nonsense commanding officer of 's embarked F-14 squadron in the 1986 box-office hit Top Gun. He portrayed the role of cold and determined District Attorney Polito in Sidney Lumet's Prince of the City. He played the obsequious and evasive union treasurer Lou Brackman in 1986’s Armed and Dangerous. He  appeared in the 1987 film Masters of the Universe as Detective Lubic. He had a dual role in the Woody Allen comedy Love and Death, playing both Napoleon and a look-alike. He appeared as Big Boy Caprice's accountant "Numbers" in the 1990 Warren Beatty film Dick Tracy. He appeared in Serpico (1973) in a small but notable role as a policeman  who loudly accuses Officer Serpico of having a homosexual encounter with another policeman in a men's room.

Tolkan has made guest appearances on many TV shows, including Naked City, Remington Steele, Miami Vice and The Fresh Prince of Bel-Air.
A member of the repertory cast of A Nero Wolfe Mystery (2001–02), he played more than a dozen varied roles in the A&E TV series and also directed two episodes ("Die Like a Dog" and "The Next Witness").

Filmography

Actor

References

External links
 
 
 

1931 births
Living people
University of Iowa alumni
Eastern Arizona College alumni
American male film actors
American male television actors
Male actors from Michigan
People from Calumet, Michigan
Nero Wolfe
21st-century American male actors
20th-century American male actors